Sibonelo is a South African given name. Notable people with the name include:

Sibonelo Makhanya (born 1996), South African cricketer
Sibonelo Mngometulu (born 1969), wife of the king of Swaziland

African given names